Dexter-Russell, Inc. is a cutlery manufacturing company in the town of Southbridge, MA. It is the largest and oldest cutlery manufacturer in the United States. Dexter-Russell, Inc offers over 2,000 items such as knives, turners, and spatulas to its customers across foodservice, processing, and industrial industries.

History

 In 1818, Henry Harrington, a New England craftsman and inventor, founded Henry Harrington Cutlery Co. Harrington originally manufactured surgical equipment, shoe knives, and firearms. In 1894, the Dexter trade name was introduced in honor of one of Henry Harrington's sons, Dexter Harrington. From there, the Dexter line of kitchen and table cutlery grew to be well known across the foodservice industry for its high quality and dependability.
 In 1834, John Russell founded the John Russell Cutlery Co. in Greenfield, MA. Originally manufacturing chisels and axe heads, John Russell Cutlery grew to primarily produce hunting knives to supply the needs of the American frontier. John Russell Cutlery ultimately replaced European brands by becoming the leading American cutlery company of the post-Civil War ear.
 In 1933, Henry Harrington and John Russell merged their companies to create Russell-Harrington Cutlery in Southbridge, Massachusetts.
 In 2001, the company changed its name to Dexter-Russell, Inc, also known as "Dexter" to its customers and industry colleagues

Products

SANI-SAFE® 
In 1941, Dexter introduced its SANI-SAFE® series to the cutlery market. Known for its sharp & durable edge, and comfortable handle, the SANI-SAFE® series became the gold standard for professional cutlery.

SOFGRIP® 
Dexter's SOFGRIP® series includes an ultra-soft, non-slip, handle coupled with a blade made from proprietary DexSteel®.

V-LO® 
V-lo style knives uses a patented handle with a unique texture made two types of soft rubber joined to a high-carbon steel blade.  V-lo knives are NSF certified.

Dexter Outdoors 
Dexter-Russell, Inc offers a line of knives tailored towards saltwater fishing enthusiasts.

References

External links 
Dexter-Russell, Inc Website

American brands
Knife manufacturing companies
Kitchen knife brands
Companies based in Worcester County, Massachusetts
American companies established in 1818
1818 establishments in Massachusetts